Lila can be a variant of the Arabic and Hebrew words for "night". Other versions are Lyla (most common in Arabic) and Lilah. As a name it means night, beauty, or dark beauty.

Lila is a common Indian female given name meaning "beauty". 

Lilavati is a variant of this name that is also the title of a twelfth-century mathematics treatise. 

Lila is also a female given name meaning purple in German.

The angel Lailah or Laylah (Heb. לַיְלָה) is an angel in some interpretations in the Talmud and in some later Jewish mythology.

People with the given name Lila 
 Lila Downs (born 1968), Mexican singer
 Lila Fenwick (1932–2020), American lawyer, human rights advocate, and United Nations official
 Lila Karp (1933–2008), American writer and activist
 Lila Kedrova (1909-2000), French actress
 Lila Lamgade (born 1991), Nepalese footballer
 Lila Lee (1905–1973), American actress
 Lila Majumdar (1908–2007), Bengali writer, also referred to as Leela Majumdar
 Lila McCann (born 1981), American country music singer
 Lila Rose (born 1988), American anti-abortion activist
 Lila Diane Sawyer (born 1945), news anchor
 Lila Tretikov (born 1978), executive director of the Wikimedia Foundation 2014–2016
 Leela Naidu (1940–2009), an Indian actress, also referred to as Lila

Fictional people 
 Lila Cerullo, one of the two protagonists in Elena Ferrante's Neapolitan Novels
 Lila (Xena), a recurring character in the television series Xena: Warrior Princess
 Lila Fowler, a character in the book series Sweet Valley High
 Lila West, alias Lila Tournay, a character in the TV serial Dexter (season 2)
 Lila Black, the main heroine of Quantum Gravity novel series by Justina Robson
 Lila Sawyer, a character from the animated television series Hey Arnold
 Lila Test, a character from the animated television series Johnny Test
 Lila Quartermaine, a character on the daytime television series General Hospital
 Lila Bard, from a Darker Shade of Magic by V. E. Schwab
Lila Rossi, a character in the animated series Miraculous: Tales of Ladybug and Cat Noir
 Lila, a minor character in the Peanuts comic strip and second Peanuts movie, Snoopy Come Home
Lila, a character in the PBS Kids animated series Pinkalicious & Peterrific

See also
 Leela (name)
 Lila (disambiguation)
 Lilla
 Leila (name)
 Leelavathi

English feminine given names
Feminine given names